Mahātmā is a Sanskrit epithet meaning "Great Soul" that is similar in usage to the Christian term saint.

Mahatma may also refer to:
 Mahathma, 1996 Malayalam film
 Mahatma (2000 film), 2000 Kannada film
 Mahatma (film), 2009 Telugu film
 Mahatma Ayyankali, a 2013 Malayalam film
 Mahatma Lalon Fakir (1774–1890), Bengali Baul saint, mystic, songwriter, social reformer and secular thinker
 Mahatma Gandhi (1869-1948), the preeminent leader of Indian nationalism in British-ruled India
 Mahatma Hansraj (1864–1938), Indian educationist and Swami Dayanand follower 
 Mahatma (magazine), magic magazine founded in 1895 by George Little 
 Mahatma Otoo (born 1992), Ghanaian footballer
 "Mahatma", a song by Barrage on Barrage
 Mahatma, a brand of rice sold by Riviana Foods, a subsidiary of Ebro Foods